Akhbar-e-Jahan (or Akhbar-e-Jehan), is a weekly Urdu language news and entertainment magazine published in Karachi, Pakistan.

It is owned by Jang Group of Newspapers. The magazine was established in 1967. The weekly is also distributed in the United Arab Emirates.

References

External links
 Akhbar-e-Jehan's official website

1967 establishments in Pakistan
Entertainment magazines
Magazines established in 1967
Mass media in Karachi
Magazines published in Pakistan
Urdu-language magazines
Weekly magazines published in Pakistan